Dimitar Petrov (22 October 1924 – 16 October 2018) was a Bulgarian film director. He directed 12 films between 1955 and 1991.

Selected filmography
 Porcupines Are Born Without Bristles (1971)
 With Children at the Seaside (1972)
 A Dog in a Drawer (1982)

References

External links

1924 births
2018 deaths
Bulgarian film directors
People from Kyustendil Province